Alexander Hepburne Macklin  (1889 – 21 March 1967) was a British physician who served as one of the two surgeons on Sir Ernest Shackleton's Imperial Trans-Antarctic Expedition of 1914–1917. When Sir Ernest Shackleton advert came out in newspapers, the surgeon signed up as he had been on many ships as a surgeon. He was also a dog trainer on Shackleton’s expedition.

Early life
Alexander Macklin was born in 1889 in India. When the family returned to Britain Dr Macklin set up practice in the Scilly Isles, where young Macklin became an enthusiastic and proficient boat handler.
He went to Plymouth College and then to the University of London. After working for a short amount of time as a deckhand, he continued his education at the Victoria University of Manchester, where he qualified as a surgeon/doctor.

Imperial Trans-Antarctic Expedition

Soon after qualifying he applied to join Shackleton's expedition and was accepted. As well as his surgeon's duties he was put in charge of the ship's dogs and was also assigned a team of sledge dogs to drive. The Endurance became trapped in the ice and was later crushed, forcing Shackleton to lead his men across the ice to open water where they travelled by boat to Elephant Island. After the ship became trapped in the ice, Macklin's dog team was put to work. He brought back several seals that had been shot for food, and once the men began the long trek across the ice, he and the other dog teams were sent back to Ocean Camp (the first camp established near the ship) to fetch supplies. Eventually all the dogs had to be shot, but Macklin's team was the last to be killed.

After arriving at Elephant Island, Shackleton and five men took one of the boats, the James Caird, and set out to fetch help from South Georgia. Macklin and McIlroy, the other surgeon, were left behind as Shackleton knew the skills would be required more on the island than on the boat: Rickinson had a heart condition, Hudson was suffering a nervous breakdown. Blackborow had gangrene in his toes and shortly after the boat left, Macklin and McIlroy were forced to amputate all the toes on his left foot; Macklin gave him a chloroform anaesthetic while McIlroy removed the toes. Like most of the crew, Macklin was awarded the Silver Polar Medal for his efforts during the expedition.

After the expedition
On his return to Britain, Macklin gained a commission as a temporary lieutenant in the Royal Army Medical Corps (RAMC), with effect from 22 November 1916. He was promoted to temporary captain on 22 November 1917. During World War I he served in France, Russia and Italy. He won the Military Cross (MC) for bravery in tending the wounded under fire while serving in Italy. 

After the war, Macklin continued to serve with the RAMC, seeing service with the Allied Expeditionary Force in Northern Russia along with his old Boss, Shackleton. He rose to the acting rank of major on 4 May 1919 and, for his service in Russia, was appointed an Officer of the Order of the British Empire on 11 November 1919 and awarded the Russian Order of Saint Stanislaus. He resigned his commission on 23 March 1920, retaining the rank of captain.

Together with former Endurance crew members Worsley, Hussey, Wild, McIlroy, Kerr, McLeod and Charles Green, Shackleton invited Macklin to join him for the Shackleton-Rowett Expedition in 1922 on board the Quest. The ship was plagued by engine trouble and eventually diverted to Rio de Janeiro. After repairs lasting several weeks, the Quest headed for South Georgia. Shackleton was troubled with heart pain throughout the voyage, but despite Macklin's orders refused to rest. In Rio, Shackleton suffered a heart attack but would not let Macklin examine him. The ship landed in South Georgia on 4 January 1922. Early in the morning of 5 January, Macklin was called to Shackleton's quarters to find him having another heart attack. He died shortly after Macklin arrived. As the ship's surgeon, it was Macklin's role to prepare the body for burial on South Georgia.

In 1926 Macklin established a practice in Dundee, where he would work for the next 21 years. At the start of World War II, he returned to active service as a major in the Medical Corps, serving in East Africa and rising to lieutenant-colonel. He received the Territorial Decoration (TD), and retired from the army in August 1948 with the honorary rank of colonel.

He married Jean in 1948 and moved to Aberdeen where he worked in various of the Aberdeen hospitals before retiring from full-time practice in 1960. He continued to work in the University Student Health Service for some years. He and Jean had two sons, Alexander and Richard. He died on 21 March 1967.

References

Bibliography 
 

20th-century British medical doctors
1889 births
1967 deaths
Alumni of the University of London
British Army personnel of the Russian Civil War
British Army personnel of World War I
British Army personnel of World War II
Explorers of Antarctica
Imperial Trans-Antarctic Expedition
Officers of the Order of the British Empire
People educated at Plymouth College
Recipients of the Military Cross
Royal Army Medical Corps officers
Military personnel of British India